Dextrous or dexterous is defined by Oxford Languages as showing or having skill, especially with the hands.

 Dexterity — fine motor skill
 When speaking of left- and right-handed people, the former can be known as "sinistrous," while the latter is "dextrous."
 See relative direction for the right-hand side

Dextrous can also mean:

 Dextrous or  DJ Dextrous
HMS Dextrous
USS Dextrous

See also
 Ambidexterity
 Dexter
 Dextre, also known as the Special Purpose Dexterous Manipulator (SPDM)
 dextrose